Events from the year 1918 in Canada.

Incumbents

Crown 
 Monarch – George V

Federal government 
 Governor General – Victor Cavendish, 9th Duke of Devonshire 
 Prime Minister – Robert Borden
 Chief Justice – Charles Fitzpatrick (Quebec) (until 21 October) then Louis Henry Davies (Prince Edward Island) (from 23 October)
 Parliament – 13th (from 16 March)

Provincial governments

Lieutenant governors 
Lieutenant Governor of Alberta – Robert Brett 
Lieutenant Governor of British Columbia – Francis Stillman Barnard 
Lieutenant Governor of Manitoba – James Albert Manning Aikins  
Lieutenant Governor of New Brunswick – William Pugsley 
Lieutenant Governor of Nova Scotia – MacCallum Grant  
Lieutenant Governor of Ontario – John Strathearn Hendrie 
Lieutenant Governor of Prince Edward Island – Augustine Colin Macdonald 
Lieutenant Governor of Quebec – Pierre-Évariste Leblanc (until October 18) then Charles Fitzpatrick (from October 21)
Lieutenant Governor of Saskatchewan – Richard Stuart Lake

Premiers 
Premier of Alberta – Charles Stewart  
Premier of British Columbia – Harlan Brewster (until March 1) then John Oliver (from March 6)
Premier of Manitoba – Tobias Norris 
Premier of New Brunswick – Walter Foster 
Premier of Nova Scotia – George Henry Murray 
Premier of Ontario – William Hearst  
Premier of Prince Edward Island – Aubin Arsenault 
Premier of Quebec – Lomer Gouin 
Premier of Saskatchewan – William Melville Martin

Territorial governments

Commissioners 
 Commissioner of Yukon – George Norris Williams (acting) (until April 1)
 Gold Commissioner of Yukon – George P. MacKenzie (from April 1)
 Commissioner of Northwest Territories – Frederick D. White (until September 27) then William Wallace Cory

Events
March 1 – Harlan Brewster, premier of British Columbia, dies in office
March 6 – John Oliver becomes premier of British Columbia
March 28 – April 1 – In the Easter Riots in Quebec City, the Militia suppress anti-conscription protesters. Four civilians are killed.
March 30 – C Squadron of Lord Strathcona's Horse (Royal Canadians) conducts a cavalry charge against the Germans at Moreuil Wood. The squadron suffers atrocious casualties, but the action is one of the keys of halting the German advance in Operation Michael. Lieutenant Gordon Flowerdew will be awarded the Victoria Cross posthumously.
April 21 – Canadian Captain Roy Brown (209 Squadron, RAF) supposedly shoots down the famed Red Baron. More accepted theories credit either Sergeant Cedric Popkin (Australian 24th Machine Gun Company), Gunner Snowy Evans or Gunner Robert Buie (both of 53rd Battery, 14th Field Artillery Brigade, RAA) with the kill.
May 24 – Canadian women (except status Indians) obtain the right to vote in federal elections (even if they did not yet have the right to vote in provincial elections); some limited women's suffrage had been granted the year earlier. Status Indians gained federal suffrage in 1960.
August 2 – The Vancouver general strike, the first general strike in Canada, triggered by the killing of Ginger Goodwin by police.
August 8 – World War I: At the Battle of Amiens superior Canadian gunners assist a great allied breakthrough (also called Canada's 100 Days)
August 26 – September 3 – Battle of Arras, 1918
September – Canadian forces arrive in northern Russia to assist the White movement  against the Bolsheviks in the Russian Civil War
September 2–3 – Battle of Drocourt-Quéant Line
September 9–12 – Battle of the Hindenburg Line
September 27 – October 2 – Battle of Canal du Nord
October 8–9 – Battle of Cambrai (1918)
October 10 – Two squadrons of the Canadian Light Horse charge the enemy at Iwuy, northeast of Cambrai. This was the last combat charge in the history of Canadian cavalry.
October 26 – The Canadian Siberian Expeditionary Force arrives in Vladivostok to aid the White movement in the Russian Civil War
November 1–2 – Battle of Valenciennes
November 11 – The Armistice goes into effect, ending combat on the Western Front. Over 600 000 Canadians fought in Europe: 70 000 were killed and 173 000 were wounded

Full date unknown
The Statistics Act is passed, creating the Dominion Bureau of Statistics
Canada demands and receives – over the initial opposition of Britain, France and the USA – the right to participate in the Versailles Peace Conference and in the League of Nations.

Arts and literature

Sport 
March 30 – The Toronto Hockey Club win their first and only Stanley Cup by defeating the Vancouver Millionaires 3 game to 2. All games were played at Toronto's Arena Gardens

Births

January to June
February 6 – Louis Dudek, poet, literary critic and publisher (d.2001)
February 13 – Ross Whicher, politician and businessman (d.2002)
February 22 – Sid Abel, ice hockey player and coach (d.2000)
February 27 – Marcel Bourbonnais, politician (d.1996)
April 2 – Marion Bryden, politician (d.2013)
April 23 – Margaret Avison, poet (d.2007)
May 1 – Raymond Mailloux, politician (d. 1995)
May 15 – Saul Laskin, politician and 1st Mayor of Thunder Bay (d.2008)
May 15 – Joseph Wiseman, actor (d. 2009)
May 28 – Johnny Wayne, comedian and comedy writer (d.1990)
June 10 – Barry Morse, actor (d.2008)
June 23 – Madeleine Parent, labour activist, feminist, aboriginal rights activist (d. 2012)

July to December
July 15 – Bertram Brockhouse, physicist, shared the Nobel Prize in Physics in 1994 (d.2003)
July 18 – Nelson Mandela, one of only two honorary Canadian citizens
August 5 – Betty Oliphant, ballet mistress, co-founder of the National Ballet School of Canada (d.2004)
October 25 – Bobby Gimby, orchestra leader, trumpeter and singer-songwriter (d.1998)
November 13 – George Grant, philosopher, teacher and political commentator (d.1988)
November 17 – Prosper Boulanger, politician and businessman (d.2002)
November 19 – Lloyd Crouse, businessman, politician and Lieutenant Governor of Nova Scotia (d.2007)
December 20 – Jean Marchand, trade unionist and politician (d.1988)
December 30 – Al Purdy, poet (d.2000)

Deaths
January 1 – Anson Dodge, lumber dealer and politician (b.1834)

January 28 – John McCrae, poet, physician, author, artist and soldier (b.1872)
March 1 – Harlan Carey Brewster, politician and Premier of British Columbia (b.1870)
March 21 – Henry Joseph Walker, politician and merchant (b.1849)
April 9 – Charles Fleetford Sise, businessman (b.1834)
August 18 – Henry Norwest, sniper in World War I (b.1884)
September 21 — Emily Julian McManus poet, author, and educator (b.1865)
October 11 – Wallace Lloyd Algie, Victoria Cross recipient (b. 1891)
October 18 – Pierre-Évariste Leblanc, politician and Lieutenant Governor of Quebec (b.1853)
November 11 – George Lawrence Price, last Commonwealth casualty of World War I (b.1898)

Historical documents
British prime minister Lloyd George details British war aims, including liberation and self-determination of nations

What Quebec wants is respect from "Anglo-Canadians" for French language, Roman Catholicism and French traditions and ideals (like love of Canada)

Ontario women recruited for summer work in food production

Saskatchewan Victoria Cross winner Hugh Cairns cited for "most conspicuous bravery

His brother describes presentation of Victoria Cross to George Pearkes, "looking a very fine soldier indeed"

Account of Canadian cavalry action resulting in Victoria Cross award for Gordon Flowerdew

Shot-down pilot describes jumping from his falling plane despite bullet wounds and burns

Canadian soldier describes his psychological strain

Folksy Canadian enjoys leave in Paris, despite street crime

Soldier appreciates "toothsomeness" of Christmas treats after living on hardtack and bully beef

U.S. soldier newspaper salutes Canadian forces, but confuses Victoria Day and Dominion Day

Saint John Housewives' League and War Gardens Association exhibit their prowess and patriotism in competitive exhibitions

Rundown of Canada's war effort in military manpower and materiel, food and fuel control, volunteer and women's roles, and veteran rehabilitation

Photos: Saanich-based Muggins the Red Cross Dog poses with military personnel in his fundraising campaign that brought in thousands of dollars

Ontario health board's tips and myths regarding influenza

Various Montreal community groups aid fight against influenza

Death notice for Mi'kmaq grand chief John Denny Jr. and inauguration of new grand chief Gabriel Sylliboy on Cape Breton Island

United Farm Women of Ontario get their male counterparts to work with them

United Farmers of Ontario protest undemocratic wartime government practices

Basic English manual is aimed at foreign-born adults of "industrial class"

Labour lawyer comments at length on deteriorating worker-management relations in Winnipeg

Journalist says people in central Canada have no more influence on government than Westerners do (and perhaps less)

Vilhjalmur Stefansson speaks on difficulties of his Arctic explorations, and overcoming them

University of Manitoba convocation speaker addresses optimism

Wilfrid Laurier comments on Louis Hémon's novel Maria Chapdelaine

References 

 
Years of the 20th century in Canada
Canada
Canada
1910s in Canada